Brookwood School, founded in 1956, is a non-denominational, co-educational, non-profit day school in Manchester-by-the-Sea, Massachusetts. Sports such as field hockey, basketball, soccer, and lacrosse are offered. There are after school classes offered by teachers as well as visitors that include sewing, music classes, knitting, and clay.

History
Brookwood School was founded in December 1956 as Essex County Day School by a group of parents who felt there was a need for another school in the area. An old estate property was purchased and the school opened in the converted stables in September 1957. Its founding headmaster was Pip Cutler.

Brookwood School had an initial enrollment of 65 students in 1957. The school has expanded its facilities and student population, and in 2010 had approximately 408 students.

Headmaster Cutler retired in 1973. The fourth headmaster, John Peterman, held the position from 1992 to 2015. In the fall of 2014, Brookwood named a new Head of School, Laura Caron.

Brookwood's Board of Trustees is the governing body, managing the school's financial and physical resources.

In 2012, Brookwood was recognized by NAIS for their global initiative efforts.

Campus
The upper school students are housed in the wing that was originally the stables.

References

External links
 

1956 establishments in Massachusetts
Educational institutions established in 1956
Manchester-by-the-Sea, Massachusetts
Private elementary schools in Massachusetts
Private middle schools in Massachusetts
Schools in Essex County, Massachusetts